Richard Ellender (born June 9, 1957) is a former American football wide receiver and return specialist who played in the National Football League.

College career
Ellender played four seasons for the McNeese State Cowboys. He was named All-Southland Conference as a senior when he had 23 receptions for 402 yards and four touchdowns. Ellender was inducted into McNeese State's Athletic Hall of Fame in 2003.

Professional career
Ellender was selected in the ninth round of the 1979 NFL Draft by the Houston Oilers. Ellender was originally cut during the preseason but was re-signed by the team. When he joined the team, the coach told him, "I don't wan't you to fumble, and every yard you move the ball toward the goal line, that's one less yard Earl [Campbell] will have to get by himself." Ellender finished the season with one reception for 15 yards and was the Oilers' leading punt and kick returner. Ellender was cut at the end of training camp in 1980.

Personal life
Ellender stayed in Houston after his football career ended and works as a loans officer.

References

External links
McNeese State Hall of Fame profile

1957 births
Living people
American football wide receivers
McNeese Cowboys football players
Players of American football from Louisiana
Houston Oilers players
American football return specialists
People from Sulphur, Louisiana